Joseph Stephanus Theuns Lewies (born 27 January 1992) is a South African rugby union player for the  in the Premiership in England. His regular position is lock.

Career

Youth
He played for the  side in 2011 and for the s in 2012 and 2013, starting 33 matches for those sides.

Sharks

He remained in the side for the rest of the season, starting two matches in total and making three substitute appearances, including coming on in the Currie Cup final, where he contributed to the Sharks beating  33–19.

Harlequins
On 20 March 2019, Lewies would travel to England to join Harlequins in the Premiership Rugby from the 2019-20 season.

He started in the Premiership final against Exeter on 26 June 2021 as Harlequins won the game 40-38 in the highest scoring Premiership final ever.

International

After Bakkies Botha became unavailable and Flip van der Merwe got injured, Springbok coach Heyneke Meyer called up Lewies for the Test match against Scotland. Lewies made his test debut on 28 June 2014, replacing stand-in captain Victor Matfield in the 55–6 thump over Scotland in Port Elizabeth.

In 2016, Lewies was included in a South Africa 'A' squad that played a two-match series against a touring England Saxons team. He was named in the starting line-up for their first match in Bloemfontein, but ended on the losing side as the visitors ran out 32–24 winners.

References

External links

 

South African rugby union players
South Africa international rugby union players
Living people
1992 births
Sharks (Currie Cup) players
Sharks (rugby union) players
Rugby union locks
South African people of British descent
Rugby union players from Pretoria